Dilip Pandey (born 1 October 1980) is an Indian politician and has represented Timarpur as a Member of the Delhi Legislative Assembly since 2020. He was the Convenor of the Delhi Unit of Aam Aadmi Party (AAP) between July 2014 and April 2017.

Career
Pandey left his software job in 2013 to join the Aam Aadmi Party.
Prior to this, Pandey worked for the Indian IT Major Tata Consultancy Services in the capacity of a Business consultant until FY 2011 and was posted at their Bangalore office.

Political career

Pandey participated in the Anna Movement. He is a spokesperson and member of the screening committee of the Aam Aadmi Party. In January 2014, Pandey was appointed secretary for political activities in the national capital.

He took over as the convenor of the Delhi unit in July 2014. Under his co-convenorship, the AAP won 67 out of 70 seats in 2015 Delhi assembly elections. Pandey later submitted his resignation in April 2017 after the AAP failed to get the majority in the 2017 MCD elections.
 
He served as the official Spokesperson of the Aam Aadmi Party from 2014 till date.

Dilip has been nominated as the Aam Aadmi Party’s in-charge for Delhi's North East Lok Sabha constituency for the 2019 General Elections.

He defeated BJP's Surinder Pal Singh (Bittoo) in the 2020 Delhi Legislative Assembly election to win the Timarpur (Vidhan Sabha constituency).

MLA Dilip Pandey was appointed Aam Aadmi Party's chief whip in the Delhi Assembly in March 2020.

Electoral performance

Bibliography

References 
 

Living people
Activists from Delhi
Aam Aadmi Party politicians
1980 births
Delhi MLAs 2020–2025
Aam Aadmi Party candidates in the 2019 Indian general election